Anne Catherine Emmerich (also Anna Katharina Emmerick; 8 September 1774 – 9 February 1824) was a Roman Catholic Augustinian Canoness Regular of Windesheim, mystic, Marian visionary, ecstatic and stigmatist.

She was born in Flamschen, a farming community at Coesfeld, in the Diocese of Münster, Westphalia, Germany, and died at age 49 in Dülmen, where she had been a nun, and later become bedridden. Emmerich reputedly experienced visions on the life and passion of Jesus Christ, as revealed to her by the Blessed Virgin Mary under religious ecstasy.

During her bedridden years, a number of well-known figures were inspired to visit her. The poet Clemens Brentano interviewed her at length and wrote two books based on his notes of her visions. The authenticity of Brentano's writings has been questioned and critics have characterized the books as "conscious elaborations by a poet".

Pope John Paul II beatified Emmerich on 3 October 2004. However, the Vatican focused on her own personal piety rather than the religious writings associated to her by Clemens Brentano.

Early life

Emmerich was born into a family of poor farmers and had nine brothers and sisters. The family's surname was derived from an ancestral town. From an early age, she helped with the house and farm work. Her schooling was rather brief, but all those who knew her noticed that she felt drawn to prayer from an early age. At twelve, she started to work at a large farm in the vicinity for three years and later learned to be a seamstress and worked as such for several years.

She applied for admission to various convents, but she was rejected because she could not afford a dowry. Eventually, the Poor Clares in Münster agreed to accept her, provided she would learn to play the organ. She went to the organist Söntgen in Coesfeld to study music and learn to play the organ, but the poverty of the Söntgen family prompted her to work there and to sacrifice her small savings in an effort to help them. Later, one of the Söntgen daughters entered the convent with her.

Religious life
In 1802, at the age of 28, Emmerich and her friend Klara Söntgen finally managed to join the Augustinian nuns at the convent of Agnetenberg in Dülmen. The following year, Emmerich took her religious vows. In the convent, she became known for her strict observance of the order's rule; but, from the beginning to 1811, she was often quite ill and had to endure great pain. At times, her zeal and strict adherence to rules disturbed some of the more tepid sisters, who were puzzled by her weak health and religious ecstasies.

When Jérôme Bonaparte, King of Westphalia, suppressed the convent in 1812, she found refuge in a widow's house.

Stigmata

In early 1813, marks of the stigmata were reported on Emmerich's body. The parish priest called in two doctors to examine her. When word of the phenomenon spread three months later, he notified the vicar general. With the news causing considerable talk in the town, the ecclesiastical authorities conducted a lengthy investigation. Many doctors wished to examine the case, and although efforts were made to discourage the curious, there were visitors whose rank or status gained them entry. During this time, the poet and romanticist Clemens Brentano first visited.

At the end of 1818, the periodic bleeding of Emmerich's hands and feet had stopped and the wounds had closed. While many in the community viewed the stigmata as real, others considered Emmerich an impostor conspiring with her associates to perpetrate a fraud. In August 1819, the civil authorities intervened and moved Emmerich to a different house, where she was kept under observation for three weeks. The members of the commission could find no evidence of fraud and were divided in their opinions.

As the cross on her breastbone had the unusual shape of a "Y", similar to a cross in the local church of Coesfeld, English priest Herbert Thurston surmised that "the subjective impressions of the stigmatic exercise a preponderating influence upon the manifestations which appear exteriorly," the same pathway to stigmata described in the works of John of Ruusbroec.

Visions and inspirations
Emmerich said that as a child she had visions in which she talked with Jesus, saw the souls in purgatory, and witnessed the core of the Holy Trinity in the form of three concentric, interpenetrating full spheres. The largest but dimmest of the spheres represented the Father core, the medium sphere the Son core, and the smallest and brightest sphere the Holy Spirit core. Each sphere of omnipresent God is extended toward infinity beyond God's core placed in heaven. The Brentano compilation tells that during an illness in Emmerich's childhood, she was visited by a child (suggested as being Jesus), who told her of plants she should ingest in order to heal, including Morning Glory flower juice, known to contain ergine.

Emmerich had many mystical visions which she spoke about. The following seems to be mirrored in many traditions as truth: She wrote, for instance, of 'a Mount of Prophets, which she clearly identified as the Himalayas, where live Enoch, Elijah and others who did not die in the ordinary way but ascended, and where animals which survived the Flood may also be found'. Some say she was seeing the legendary spiritual fortress of Shambala (Eastern tradition), or the Magical City of Luz (Hebrew Tradition), basically a place found in many ancient traditions where those who are immortal, or special in such a way, go. (This is mostly based on page 173 of The Secret History of the World by Jonathan Black)

Based on Emmerich's growing reputation, a number of figures who were influential in the renewal movement of the Church early in the 19th century came to visit her, among them Clemens August von Droste zu Vischering, the future Archbishop of Cologne; Johann Michael Sailer, the Bishop of Ratisbon, since 1803 the sole surviving Elector Spiritual of the Holy Roman Empire; Bernhard Overberg and authors Luise Hensel and Friedrich Stolberg. Clemens von Droste, at the time still vicar‑general of the Archdiocese, called Emmerich "a special friend of God" in a letter he wrote to Stolberg.

Clemens Brentano's visits

At the time of Emmerich's second examination in 1819, Brentano visited her. He claimed that she told him he was sent to help her fulfill God's command, to express in writing the revelations made to her. Brentano became one of Emmerich's many supporters at the time, believing her to be a "chosen Bride of Christ". Professor Andrew Weeks claims that Brentano's own personal complexes were a factor in substituting Emmerich as a maternal figure in his own life.

From 1819 until Emmerich's death in 1824, Brentano filled many notebooks with accounts of her visions involving scenes from the New Testament and the life of the Virgin Mary. Because Emmerich only spoke the Westphalian dialect, Brentano could not transcribe her words directly, and often could not even take notes in her presence, so he would quickly write in standard German when he returned to his own apartment a set of notes based on what he remembered of the conversations he had with Emmerich. Brentano edited the notes later, years after the death of Emmerich.

About ten years after Emmerich had recounted her visions, Brentano completed editing his records for publication. In 1833, he published his first volume, The Dolorous Passion of Our Lord Jesus Christ According to the Meditations of Anne Catherine Emmerich. Brentano then prepared The Life of the Blessed Virgin Mary from the Visions of Anna Catherine Emmerich for publication, but he died in 1842. The book was published posthumously in 1852 in Munich.

Catholic priest Karl Schmoger edited Brentano's manuscripts and from 1858 to 1880 published the three volumes of The Life of Our Lord. In 1881, a large illustrated edition followed. Schmoger also penned a biography of Anne Catherine Emmerich in two volumes that has been republished in English language editions.

The Vatican does not endorse the authenticity of the books written by Brentano. However, it views their general message as "an outstanding proclamation of the gospel in service to salvation". Other critics have been less sympathetic and have characterized the books Brentano produced from his notes as "conscious elaborations of an overwrought romantic poet".

Brentano wrote that Emmerich said she believed that Noah's son Ham was the progenitor of "the black, idolatrous, stupid nations" of the world. The "Dolorous Passion" is claimed to reveal a "clear antisemitic strain throughout", with Brentano writing that Emmerich believed that "Jews ... strangled Christian children and used their blood for all sorts of suspicious and diabolical practices".

Allegations of partial fabrication by Brentano

When the case for Emmerich's beatification was submitted to the Vatican in 1892, a number of experts in Germany began to compare and analyze Brentano's original notes from his personal library with the books he had written. The analysis revealed various apocryphal biblical sources, maps, and travel guides among his papers, which could have been used to enhance Emmerich's narrations.

In his 1923 theological thesis, German priest Winfried Hümpfner, who had compared Brentano's original notes to the published books, wrote that Brentano had fabricated much of the material he had attributed to Emmerich.

By 1928, the experts had come to the conclusion that only a small portion of Brentano's books could be safely attributed to Emmerich.

At the time of Emmerich's beatification in 2004, the Vatican position on the authenticity of the Brentano books was elucidated by priest Peter Gumpel, who was involved in the study of the issues for the Congregation for the Causes of the Saints: "It is absolutely not certain that she ever wrote this. There is a serious problem of authenticity." According to Gumpel, the writings attributed to Emmerich were "absolutely discarded" by the Vatican as part of her beatification process.

Death and burial
Emmerich began to grow weaker during the summer of 1823. She died on 9 February 1824 in Dülmen and was buried in the graveyard outside the town, with a large number of people attending her funeral. Her grave was reopened twice in the weeks following the funeral, due to a rumor that her body had been stolen, but the coffin and the body were found to be intact.

In February 1975, Emmerich's remains were moved to the Holy Cross Church in Dülmen, where they rest today.

House of the Virgin Mary

Neither Brentano nor Emmerich had ever been to Ephesus, and indeed the city had not yet been excavated; but visions contained in The Life of The Blessed Virgin Mary were used during the discovery of the House of the Virgin Mary, the Blessed Virgin's supposed home before her Assumption, located on a hill near Ephesus, as described in the book Mary's House.

Here is an excerpt of Emmerich's description of Mary's House:

"The Blessed Virgin's dwelling was not in Ephesus itself, but from three to four hours distant. It stood on a height upon which several Christians from Judea, among them some of the holy women related to her, had taken up their abode. Between this height and Ephesus glided, with many a crooked curve, a little river. The height sloped obliquely toward Eph­esus."

In 1881 a French priest, the Abbé Julien Gouyet, used Emmerich's book to search for the house in Ephesus and found it based on the descriptions. He was not taken seriously at first, but sister Marie de Mandat-Grancey persisted until two other priests followed the same path and confirmed the finding.

The Holy See has taken no official position on the authenticity of the location yet, but in 1951 Pope Pius XII initially declared the house a Holy Place. Pope John XXIII later made the declaration permanent. Pope Paul VI in 1967, Pope John Paul II in 1979 and Pope Benedict XVI in 2006 visited the house and treated it as a shrine.

Beatification

The process of Emmerich's beatification was started in 1892 by the Bishop of Münster. In 1928, however, the Vatican suspended the process when it was suspected that Clemens Brentano had fabricated some of the material that appeared in the books he wrote, and which he had attributed to Emmerich.

In 1973, the Congregation for the Causes of the Saints allowed the case for her beatification to be re-opened, provided it only focused on the issue of her life, without any reference to the possibly doctored material produced by Clemens Brentano.

In July 2003, the Congregation for the Causes of the Saints promulgated a decree of a miracle attributed to her, and that paved the way for her beatification.

On 3 October 2004, Anne Catherine Emmerich was beatified by Pope John Paul II. However, the books produced by Brentano were set aside, and her cause adjudicated solely on the basis of her own personal sanctity and virtue. Peter Gumpel, who was involved in the analysis of the matter at the Vatican, told Catholic News Service: "Since it was impossible to distinguish what derives from Sister Emmerich and what is embroidery or additions, we could not take these writings as a criterion [in the decision on beatification]. Therefore, they were simply discarded completely from all the work for the cause."

Cinematic portrayals
In 2003, actor and director Mel Gibson used Brentano's book The Dolorous Passion as a key source for his 2004 film The Passion of the Christ. Gibson stated that Scripture and "accepted visions" were the only sources he drew on, and a careful reading of Brentano's book shows the film's high level of dependence on it.

In 2007 German director Dominik Graf made the movie The Pledge as a dramatization of the encounters between Emmerich (portrayed by actress ) and Clemens Brentano, based on a novel by Kai Meyer.

See also
 Alexandrina of Balazar
 Maria Valtorta
 Marthe Robin
 Maria Domenica Lazzeri
 Marie Rose Ferron

Notes

Bibliography

English editions of Emmerich's visions

 Emmerich, Anna Catherine. The Nativity of our Lord Jesus Christ, Burns & Oates, 1899.
 Emmerich, Anna Catherine. Pray the Rosary with Blessed Anne Catherine Emmerich. Edited by Scott L. Smith Jr., Holy Water Books, 2022.
 Emmerich, Anna Catherine. The Lowly Life and Bitter Passion of Our Lord Jesus Christ and His Blessed Mother, Sentinel, 1915 [third volume only].
 Emmerich, Anna Catherine. The Dolorous Passion of Our Lord Jesus Christ. Charlotte, NC: TAN Books, 2009. 
 Emmerich, Anna Catherine. The Life of the Blessed Virgin Mary: From the Visions of Anna Catherine Emmerich: Charlotte, NC: TAN Books, 2009. 
 Emmerich, Anna Catherine. Life of Jesus Christ and Biblical Revelations. Charlotte, NC: TAN Books, 2008. 
 Emmerich, Anna Catherine. The Bitter Passion and the Life of Mary: From the Visions of Anna Catherine Emmerich: As Recorded in the Journals of Clemens Brentano. Fresno, California: Academy Library Guild, 1954.

Literature
 Corcoran, Rev. Mgr. "Anne Katherina Emmerich," The American Catholic Quarterly Review, Vol. X, 1885.
 Frederickson, Paula. ed. On the Passion of the Christ. Los Angeles: University of California Press, 2006.
 Kathleen Corley and Robert Webb. ed. Jesus and Mel Gibson's Passion of the Christ. The Film, the Gospel and the Claims of History. London: Continuum, 2004. 
 Ram, Helen. The Life of Anne Catharine Emmerich, Burns and Oates, 1874.
 Schmoger, Karl. Life of Anna Katherina Emmerich. Rockford, Illinois: Tan Books and Publications, 1974.  (set);  (volume 1);  (volume 2)
 Wegener, Thomas. Life of Sister Anna Katherina Emmerich: New York: Benziger Brothers: 1898.

External links 

 
 
 
 

 
Hartmann S.J., Hubert, "the Case of Sister Anne Catherine Emmerich", Fortnightly Review, Vol.XXIX, No.12, St. Louis, Missouri, 1922

1774 births
1824 deaths
18th-century Christian mystics
19th-century Christian mystics
People from Coesfeld
19th-century German Roman Catholic nuns
Augustinian nuns
Augustinian canonesses
German beatified people
Roman Catholic writers
Stigmatics
Roman Catholic mystics
Beatifications by Pope John Paul II
Marian visionaries
Venerated Catholics by Pope John Paul II
Women mystics
Blood libel